Edwas, or Beneraf, is a Papuan language of Indonesia. "Edwas", the name of a former village, is the native name; "Beneraf", the name of one of two current villages, is what the neighboring peoples and previously the Dutch use(d) for them. The ISO 639 standard confuses it with Bonerif, another language in the same family.

References

Languages of western New Guinea
Orya–Tor languages